"Heaven" is the thirty-seventh single released by Ayumi Hamasaki, released on September 14, 2005. "Heaven" ended up selling over 325,000 copies, making it Hamasaki's second highest-selling single of 2005 as well as her last single to date that has sold over 300,000 physical copies. "Heaven" was used as the theme of the Japanese film Shinobi Heart Under Blade, while "Will" was used in a television commercial for Panasonic.

Music video
The music video for "Heaven" features Ayumi singing alone in a subway. As she does, ghosts frequently pass by her. Near the end of the video, the spirits leave Ayumi and board on a train (implying their departure to heaven). The video is done entirely in one shot and in black and white.

Track listing
CD
 "Heaven" – 4:18
 "Will" – 4:07
 "Alterna" (orchestra version)
 "Heaven" (piano version) – 4:18
 "Heaven" (instrumental) – 4:18
 "Will" (instrumental) – 4:07

DVD
 "Heaven" (PV)
 "Heaven" (photo gallery)
 "Heaven" (TV-CM)

Live performances
 September 9, 2005 – Music Station
 September 16, 2005 – Music Station
 September 16, 2005 – Music Fighter
 September 17, 2005 – CDTV
 September 23, 2005 – PopJam
 October 7, 2005 – Music Station
 December 23, 2005 – Music Station Super Live – "Heaven" and "Bold & Delicious"

Chart performance
On the day of its release it reached the number-two position on the Oricon chart; the second day it was at number three. It reached stayed at the top position for the rest of the week, however. At the end of the week, the physical sales of "Heaven" was over 169,000 units, topping the weekly Oricon chart. Overall, it lasted for forty-six days in the top twenty of the Oricon daily charts over a forty-nine-day period; forty-two of them being consecutive.

Oricon Sales Chart (Japan)

  Total Sales :  370,000 (Japan)
 RIAJ certification: Platinum

References

External links 
 "Heaven" information at Avex Network
 "Heaven" information at Avex Network
 "Heaven" information at Oricon

Ayumi Hamasaki songs
2005 singles
Oricon Weekly number-one singles
Songs written by Ayumi Hamasaki
Songs with music by Kazuhito Kikuchi
2005 songs
Song recordings produced by Max Matsuura
Avex Trax singles
Japanese film songs